Józef Użycki (born 1 December 1932) was a Polish military officer, and communist politician. He was a general in the Polish Army and Polish General Staff of Poland from 1983 to 1990.

Life
He was born in the village of Kiertyn in Stryi county (now Ukraine), in the Polish Second Republic.  In February 1940, he and his family were deported to Siberia to Krasnoyarsk Krai, from where he returned to the country in 1946. After returning, he lived in Gliwice, where he attended high school.

He began his military service in 1950, as a podchorąży, attending Officer Infantry school Number One in Wrocław. In 1952 he was promoted to the rank of podporuchnik, after which he was sent to the commander of the school platoon, and then deputy commander of a company at the 4th Infantry Regiment in Kielce (where he served until October 1954). In 1954-1957 he studied at the General Staff Academy. After graduation, he became chief of staff of a battalion at the 33rd Mechanized Regiment in Nysa (1957-1959). In 1959-1966 he served in the Staff of the Silesian Military District, where he was an officer of the Operational Department. In 1966, he became Chief of Staff/Deputy Commander of the 10th Medium Tank Regiment in Opole.

He commanded this regiment, participating in the Warsaw Pact invasion of Czechoslovakia. During the Armed Forces Inspection, the regiment commanded by him received a very good grade. In 1969, he became chief of staff/deputy commander of the 11th Dresden Armoured Division in Żagań. From 1971 to 1973, he was a student at the Military Academy of General Staff of the Armed Forces of the USSR in Moscow. In 1973, he took command of the 11th Dresden Armoured Division. In this position, in 1974, he was promoted to a brigadier general by a resolution of the Polish Council of State. The nomination was presented in Belweder by the President of the Polish Council of State prof. Henryk Jabłoński in the presence of the First Secretary of the Central Committee of the Polish United Workers Party Edward Gierek. The division he commanded was repeatedly distinguished, including twice in one year by order of the Minister of National Defence. In 1976 he became Chief of Staff/Deputy Commander of the Pomeranian Military District in Bydgoszcz. In 1978, he was appointed commander of this military district, and in case of war commander of the 1st Army. In 1979, he was promoted to Divisional General. In 1983, he became deputy chief of the General Staff of the Polish Army for operations. In 1983–1990, Chief of the General Staff and Deputy Ministry of National Defense (Poland).

In 1951 he joined the Polish United Workers' Party. In 1963 he became a member of the executive of the OOP of the Operations Department of the Staff of Silesian Military District, and from 1964 to 1966 he was secretary of the OOP. In April 1975, he sat on the Provincial Committee of the party in Zielona Góra, as well as in the Party Committee of the Silesian Military District. He was a delegate to the 5th, 7th, 8th and 9th Congresses of the Polish United Workers' Party. From 1980 to 1985, he was a member of the 8th term Sejm of the People's Republic of Poland. From December 13, 1981, to July 21, 1983, a member of the Military Council of National Salvation. From 1986 to 1990, he was a member of the Central Committee of the Polish United Workers' Party.

He was the Co-author of the new Polish Defence doctrine, which he presented in January 1990 at the conference of Chiefs of General Staff of European and North American countries in Vienna

He lives in Warsaw. He is married and has one son.

Awards

 Commemorative Medal „40th Anniversary of Socialist Bulgaria” (Bulgaria)
 Commemorative Medal "40th Anniversary of the Liberation of Czechoslovakia by Soviet Army" (Czechoslovakia)
 Medal "For Strengthening of Brotherhood in Arms" (Soviet Union)
 Jubilee Medal "Forty Years of Victory in the Great Patriotic War 1941–1945" (Soviet Union)
 Jubilee Medal "70 Years of the Armed Forces of the USSR" (Soviet Union)
 Medal „30 years of the People's National Army” (East Germany)
 Medal „30 years of The Revolutionary Armed Forces of Cuba” (Cuba)

References

Members of the Sejm of the Polish People's Republic
Polish generals
Military Academy of the General Staff of the Armed Forces of the Soviet Union alumni
Polish People's Army personnel
Commanders of the Order of Polonia Restituta
Knights of the Order of Polonia Restituta
Polish United Workers' Party members
1932 births
Living people